"Arde el Cielo" ( English: The Sky Burns ) is the second radio single and fourteenth track from Maná's third live album, Arde El Cielo (2008). On August 9, 2008 the song debuted at fifty on the U.S. Billboard Hot Latin Tracks.

Music video
The music video for the song was directed by Diego González and Tim Zimmer. It has footage of environmental issues and major historical, often tragic events.

Charts

References

2008 singles
Maná songs
Spanish-language songs
Songs written by Fher Olvera
Warner Music Latina singles
2008 songs